Bananas Comedy Club are two venues for stand-up comedy: the original founded in 1986 in Poughkeepsie, New York and the other opening its doors in 1988 in Hasbrouck Heights, New Jersey. Top comedians in the business have stopped by throughout the years including Jackie Mason, Jerry Seinfeld, Chris Rock, Rita Rudner, Jamie Foxx, Tim Allen, Brian Regan, Jeff Dunham, Sinbad, Caroline Rhea, Pat Cooper, Paul Reiser, Tommy Davidson, Rich Vos, John Pinette, Jim Breuer, Robert Klein, Patrice O'Neal, Bobcat Goldthwait, Glen and side kick Barbara and many more. Both clubs are still open as of September 2009. Kyle Barnet and Brandon Michael hosted their weekly show “Another Day, Another Set” from 2007-2010.

Jimmy Fallon first stepped on a comedy stage at Bananas. His mother had told him about an impression contest, so Fallon came up with a routine about a commercial for troll dolls. He ended up winning the contest and after college he began touring the country.

Chris Halef recorded his album No Liberals Allowed at the Poughkeepsie location.

References

External links
Bananas Comedy Club website

Comedy clubs in the United States
Buildings and structures in Poughkeepsie, New York
Tourist attractions in Poughkeepsie, New York
Tourist attractions in Bergen County, New Jersey